In photographic optics, the Zeiss formula is a supposed formula for computing a circle of confusion (CoC) criterion for depth of field (DoF) calculations.

The Zeiss formula is apocryphal, in the sense that it has grown to be a well-known named concept by propagation through the internet, even though it has no official origin, little connection to Carl Zeiss Company, and no recognition or usage in the photographic industry outside the web community.

The number 1/1730 derives from a circle of confusion diameter of 0.025 mm on a full-frame 35 mm film format, with diagonal size about 43.25 mm (43.25/0.025 is 1730).  The CoC size of 0.025 mm for this format appears in Jacobson's Photographic Lenses Tutorial,
and the 1730 in his 1996 Photographic Lenses FAQ.
Jacobson derived the 0.025 mm CoC number from analysis of the Zeiss Triotar lens DoF markings on the Rollei B35 (see photo).  The manual for the Rollei B35 also states 0.025 mm CoC for its tabulated DoF distances, though it also includes an example DoF reading that implies a larger CoC.

By 2001, the term "Zeiss formula" had appeared, in the manual for the on-line DoF calculator f/calc.

On the other hand, Zeiss gives the values d/1000 as the traditional standard and d/1500 as the modern standard.

See also

Circle of confusion
Depth of field
Hyperfocal distance

References

Science of photography